"Glass no Palm Tree" (Japanese: ガラスのPalm Tree) is the final single by Kiyotaka Sugiyama & Omega Tribe, released by VAP on November 7, 1985. The song peaked at No. 5 on the Oricon charts.

Track listing

Single

Charts

Weekly charts

Year-end charts

References 

1985 singles
Omega Tribe (Japanese band) songs
Songs with lyrics by Chinfa Kan
Songs written by Tetsuji Hayashi